Arthur Ainslie Ageton (October 25, 1900 – April 23, 1971) was a naval officer, ambassador, writer, and writing teacher. He was the United States Ambassador to Paraguay from September 9, 1954, to April 10, 1957. He was also a rear admiral in the Navy.

He wrote or cowrote books, including The Naval Officer's Guide, Admiral Ambassador to Russia, Manual of Celestial Navigation, and The Marine Officer's Guide.

He was born in Fromberg, Montana and raised in Pullman, Washington, and he died in Bethesda, Maryland.

Education
After receiving his high school diploma Ageton went to Washington State College for one year from 1918 to 1919. He graduated from the Naval Academy in 1923 and earned a post-graduate certificate in 1931. He earned a master's degree in Modern Writing from Johns Hopkins University in 1953.

Navy history

He served as executive officer aboard the battleship USS Washington, promoted to captain, commanded LST Flotilla 3 in the Southwest Pacific, and received the Bronze Star for bravery at the battle of Leyte Gulf.

He wrote The Naval Officer's Guide (1943), six editions in all, and other manuals. He retired as a rear admiral on December 1, 1947.

Civilian career

Ageton served as the ambassador to Paraguay from 1954 to 1957.

Eventually, he taught creative writing at George Washington University.

Selected works 
Dead Reckoning Altitude and Azimuth Table. (1932)
Manual of Celestial Navigation. (1942) 
Naval Officer's Guide. (1942)
Naval Leadership and the American Bluejacket. (1944) 
Mary Jo and Little Liu. With pictures by Olive Bailey. (1945) 
The Jungle Seas. (1954) 
Admiral Ambassador to Russia with Adm. William H. Stadley (1955)
The Marine Officer's Guide with Gen. G. C. Thomas and Col. R. D. Heinl (1955)
Hit the Beach (1961)

Awards and honors 
He received the Legion of Merit and the Bronze Star.  From Paraguay, he received the Gran Cruz Orden Nacional del Merito.

Personal life 
Ageton married Jo Lucille Gallion on Nov. 24, 1933.  They had two children: Arthur Ainslie Ageton Jr. and Mary Jo Ageton.

Death and legacy 
Ageton died in 1971.

His papers are held in the de Grummond Collection of the McCain Library and Archives at the University of Southern Mississippi and in the Howard Gotlieb Archival Research Center of Boston University.

See also

References 

 

1900 births
1971 deaths
Ambassadors of the United States to Paraguay
United States Navy personnel of World War II
United States Navy rear admirals
People from Carbon County, Montana
Washington State University alumni
Johns Hopkins University alumni
George Washington University faculty
20th-century American non-fiction writers